Chondrometopum arcuatum is a species of ulidiid or picture-winged fly in the genus Chondrometopum of the family Tephritidae.

References

Ulidiidae